John Vartan (February 8, 1945 – December 15, 2004) was an American entrepreneur and a noted educational philanthropist in the Harrisburg, Pennsylvania area where he lived.

Business career

Vartan grew up in the Armenian village of Anjar in Lebanon, also known as Haoush Mousa. After obtaining an engineering degree from Michigan Technological University, and a master's degree from Pennsylvania State University, he started working for Gannett Fleming, Inc. in the early 1970s. He subsequently started his own firms which include:
 Vartan Group, Inc. (real estate development)
 Vartan Construction Company (building construction)
 Vartan National Bank (later sold and renamed Centric Bank in early 2007)
 Parev (restaurant business)

Vartan became an expert in developing relatively inexpensive office buildings that helped spur widespread development in the greater Harrisburg area. While other developers shunned the area, Vartan actively capitalized on its low land prices. Often allied with Harrisburg Mayor Stephen R. Reed, Vartan helped change downtown Harrisburg by acquiring substandard residences and businesses, and constructing new office buildings in their stead. Although he did not achieve everything that he sought out to do, his achievements changed the public's perception of Harrisburg.

Yet as Harrisburg developed, intense competition emerged. Faced with what he considered as unfair public subsidization and favoritism to competitors, Vartan was never hesitant in filing lawsuits against both competitors and local governments, and he won most of the time. His life was, however, marred with serious obstacles. At one point, his ambitious development plans aroused so much community opposition that he threatened to leave Harrisburg. A "Committee to Keep John Vartan in Harrisburg" was quickly formed, and succeeded in persuading him to stay put.

Vartan's crowning achievement was perhaps his re-establishment of Harrisburg's venerable "Tuesday Club", founded by state Senator Harvey Taylor, in the 1950s. To help subsidize the building, he constructed the first permanent headquarters for the "Tuesday Club" at his own expense. He also established a high quality restaurant, Parev, decorated with distinctive Armenian art, to provide another high quality restaurant for Harrisburg. The "Tuesday Club" soon became a mecca for Pennsylvania's political, business, media  and  civic leaders.

In early 1989, Vartan was diagnosed with throat cancer. Even though his cancer made it difficult for him to talk and to be understood at times, he continued with his business expansion and civic leadership. On November 22, 2004, the Management announced that the Vartan family would be taking over the operations of the "Vartan Group". Vartan died on December 15, 2004, after his 15-year battle with throat cancer. He is survived by his wife, Maral, his four children, his three brothers, and his sister.

Philanthropy
Vartan's faith in the American legal process made him unusually responsive to suggestions that Harrisburg needed a new law school. Approached by Widener University for help in 1986 because of his dual role as a developer and the then-largest individual contributor to Penn State University, he surprised the university and other law school advocates by donating land, including his own spacious home, and cash of nearly $2 million, and by offering financial loans.

After the Harrisburg campus of Widener University School of Law opened in 1989, Vartan donated the surrounding land to the campus, including an even more luxurious home that he had built to replace his first home. After the establishment of the law school, Widener University added nursing and social work programs to the campus.

He was named to the PoliticsPA list of politically influential Pennsylvanians.

Vartan's publicly acclaimed generosity to Widener University led to renewed requests from Penn State. He then made donations for two Harrisburg buildings, one across from the state capitol, and the other one, a few blocks away. Vartan's educational philanthropy also included the funding of a Harrisburg public school program of after-school tutoring, the results of which were praised by both parents and educators.

References

1945 births
2004 deaths
American people of Armenian descent
American real estate businesspeople
American restaurateurs
American construction businesspeople
People from Dauphin County, Pennsylvania
Michigan Technological University alumni
Pennsylvania State University alumni
Businesspeople from Pennsylvania
People from Beqaa Governorate
20th-century American businesspeople